Nowa Kamionka may refer to the following places:
Nowa Kamionka, Augustów County in Podlaskie Voivodeship (north-east Poland)
Nowa Kamionka, Sokółka County in Podlaskie Voivodeship (north-east Poland)
Nowa Kamionka, Suwałki County in Podlaskie Voivodeship (north-east Poland)